Vitéz Jenő Rátz de Nagylak (20 September 1882 – 21 January 1952) was a Hungarian military officer and politician, who served as Minister of Defence in 1938.

He fought in the First World War. During the Hungarian Soviet Republic he served in the National Army. From 1 October 1936 he became Chief of the General Staff of the Royal Hungarian Army (Magyar Királyi Honvédség). Béla Imrédy appointed him as Minister of Defence. After that he was a representative in the House of Representatives of Hungary. During the cabinet of Döme Sztójay he was a minister without portfolio and Deputy Prime Minister. After the war the People's Tribunal sentenced Rátz to death by firing squad, but his sentence was later reduced to life imprisonment. He died in prison in 1952.

References
 Magyar Életrajzi Lexikon
 168 Óra Online – István Bölcs: Díszmagyar és rohamsisak  2007-06-20. Retrieved 11 September 2010.

1882 births
1952 deaths
Politicians from Zrenjanin
People from the Kingdom of Hungary
Hungarians in Vojvodina
Hungarian fascists
Hungarian soldiers
Austro-Hungarian military personnel of World War I
Defence ministers of Hungary
Speakers of the House of Magnates
Hungarian collaborators with Nazi Germany
Hungarian people convicted of war crimes
Hungarian prisoners sentenced to death
Prisoners sentenced to death by Hungary
Prisoners who died in Hungarian detention
Hungarian people who died in prison custody
Hungarian politicians convicted of crimes
Military personnel from Zrenjanin